Perznica is a river of Poland, a tributary of the Parsęta near Sucha.

Rivers of Poland
Rivers of West Pomeranian Voivodeship